Oyo can refer to:

Places

Nigeria
 Oyo Empire, a former Yoruba state that covered parts of Nigeria and Benin, or the capital city
 Oyo State, a present-day state of Nigeria named after the Oyo Empire
 Oyo, Oyo State, a city founded in the 1830s as an alternative capital of the remnants of the old Oyo empire

Republic of the Congo
 Oyo, Congo, a city in the Cuvette Region

Indonesia
 Oyo River, in southern Java

Other uses 
 Oyo Boy Sotto (born 1984), Filipino actor
 Oyo (e-reader), e-book reader
 OYO Rooms, a budget hotel chain 
 Õÿö, album by Angélique Kidjo

See also